Cuenya is one of six parishes (administrative divisions) in Nava, a municipality within the province and autonomous community of Asturias, in northern Spain.  It has an area of 11.36 square kilometers and in the 2001 census 193 houses were counted.

Parishes in Nava